Orlando Miller Salmon (born January 13, 1969), is a former professional baseball player who played in Major League Baseball primarily as a shortstop from 1994–97.

Career
Orlando Miller got his pro career started in the minor leagues in 1991. Miller saw playing time with both the Jackson Generals of the class double "A" Texas League and with the Osceola Astros of the class "A" Florida State League in 1991. Miller returned to Jackson in 1992, moving up to triple "A" with the Tucson Toros of the Pacific Coast League later in the season. Miller played for the Toros once again in 1993 before his big break into the major leagues with the Houston Astros in 1994. He played for the Astros for two more seasons, then finished his MLB career with the Detroit Tigers in 1997.

Miller continued to play in the minor leagues for eleven more seasons, including stints with the Mexican League's Guerreros de Oaxaca in 2000 and Olmecas de Tabasco in 2002. He played for the independent American Association's Sioux Falls Canaries in 2007, and finished his minor league career with the Edmonton Cracker-Cats in 2008.

See also
 Houston Astros award winners and league leaders

External links

1969 births
Living people
Albuquerque Dukes players
Asheville Tourists players
Atlantic City Surf players
Buffalo Bisons (minor league) players
Detroit Tigers players
Edmonton Cracker-Cats players
Fort Lauderdale Yankees players
Guerreros de Oaxaca players
Gulf Coast Yankees players
Houston Astros players
Jackson Generals (Texas League) players
Jacksonville Suns players
Lakeland Tigers players
Langosteros de Cancún players
Major League Baseball shortstops
Major League Baseball players from Panama
Nashua Pride players
New Orleans Zephyrs players
Newark Bears players
Olmecas de Tabasco players
Omaha Royals players
Oneonta Yankees players
Osceola Astros players
Panamanian expatriate baseball players in Canada
Panamanian expatriate baseball players in Mexico
Panamanian expatriate baseball players in the United States
People from Changuinola District
Rieleros de Aguascalientes players
Rochester Red Wings players
San Antonio Missions players
Somerset Patriots players
Sioux Falls Canaries players
Toledo Mud Hens players
Tucson Toros players
2006 World Baseball Classic players
Panamanian expatriate baseball players in Taiwan
Koos Group Whales players